Artur Kuznetsov may refer to:

Artur Kuznetsov (Russian footballer), born 1972
Artur Kuznetsov (Ukrainian footballer), born 1995